Trinity River National Wildlife Refuge was established on January 4, 1994 with an initial purchase of . Since that time, the refuge has acquired additional acreage which now totals . The primary purpose of establishing this refuge is to protect a portion of the bottomland hardwood forest ecosystem along the Trinity River located in southeastern Texas. The refuge, which is a remnant of what was once a much larger natural area is a broad flat floodplain made up of numerous sloughs, oxbow lakes, artesian wells, and tributaries.

References
Refuge website

National Wildlife Refuges in Texas
Protected areas established in 1994
Protected areas of Liberty County, Texas
Wetlands of Texas
Landforms of Liberty County, Texas
1994 establishments in Texas